The Saenuri Party held a leadership election on 9 August 2016. It was an election to elect a new party leader after the 2016 legislative election defeat.

The new leader, Lee Jung-hyun was the first leader from Honam region in the history of South Korean conservative parties.

Candidates

Running 
 Lee Jung-hyun, member of the National Assembly.
 Lee Ju-young, member of the National Assembly, former Minister of Oceans and Fisheries.
 Joo Ho-young, member of the National Assembly, former Minister without portfolio.
 Han Sun-kyo, member of the National Assembly.

Withdrew 
 Choung Byoung-gug, member of the National Assembly, former Minister of Culture, Sports and Tourism.

Results

References 

Liberty Korea Party
Saenuri
Saenuri